GTrans is a municipal transit agency that serves Gardena, California and surrounding Los Angeles County neighbourhoods. It was founded on January 15, 1940, as Gardena Municipal Bus Lines. On the agency's 75th anniversary, the agency was renamed as GTrans. The bus lines complement the Los Angeles County Metropolitan Transportation Authority's crosstown routes through the city.

Routes 
As of September 2021, GTrans operates 3 daily routes, 2 weekday routes and 1 event route. Weekend service is provided on New Year's Day, Martin Luther King, Jr. Day, Memorial Day, Independence Day, Labor Day, Thanksgiving Day, and Christmas Day.

References

External links 

 

Public transportation in Los Angeles County, California
Bus transportation in California
Gardena, California
1940 establishments in California